The Vertical Smile is a political satire novel by Richard Condon, published in 1971.  It deals with politics, sex and greed, centering on the 68-year-old mother of a political candidate falling in love with a 70-year-old man with a very outrageous and scandalous history.

Reception
The novel was panned by Kirkus in 1971. The reviewer wrote that "those who remember Mr. Condon as a staggering storyteller will have to look elsewhere" and "very readable it's not".

References

External links
1971 Review in Time

1971 American novels
Novels by Richard Condon
American political novels
Political satire books